Wiremu Te Kahui Kararehe (1846–1904) was a notable New Zealand tribal leader and historian. Of Māori descent, he identified with the Taranaki iwi. He was born in Te Ahoroa Pa, Taranaki, New Zealand in 1846.

References

1846 births
1904 deaths
19th-century New Zealand historians
Taranaki (iwi)